Lampernisse is a small village in Diksmuide, a part of Belgium. The village hosts a Russian Orthodox Church.

External links
Lampernisse at City Review

Populated places in West Flanders
Sub-municipalities of Diksmuide